Victoria "Vicky" Frances Bruce (born May 31, 1994) is an American soccer player who plays as a defender for Bristol City in the English FA Women's Championship.

Career
She graduated from Cannon School in Concord N.C. As a soccer player at Cannon she played all three positions on the field: selected All-Conference, All-Region and All-State in the NCISAA Independent League. She did not compete as a junior players, during an injury. She was also captain of High School Team as a senior.

She previously played for Morön BK in the Elitettan, Apollon Limassol in the Cypriot First Division, Fimleikafélag Hafnarfjarðar in the Úrvalsdeild kvenna and Rangers in the Scottish Women's Premier League (SWPL).

In January 2020, she signed with the Fortuna Hjørring, in the Elitedivisionen league.

References

External links
 Vicky Bruce player profile at Davidson Wildcats 
 

1996 births
Living people
American women's soccer players
Soccer players from North Carolina
People from Cornelius, North Carolina
Women's association football midfielders
Rangers W.F.C. players
Apollon Ladies F.C. players
Fortuna Hjørring players
Vicky Bruce
Expatriate women's footballers in Denmark
Expatriate women's footballers in Sweden
Expatriate women's footballers in Iceland
Expatriate women's footballers in Cyprus
Expatriate women's footballers in Scotland
American expatriate women's soccer players
American expatriate sportspeople in Sweden
American expatriate sportspeople in Denmark
American expatriate sportspeople in Iceland
American expatriate sportspeople in Cyprus
American expatriate sportspeople in Scotland
21st-century American women
Davidson Wildcats women's soccer players